Jamalabad (also Romanized as Jamālābād) is a village in Sarvestan Rural District, in the Central District of Bavanat County, Fars Province, Iran. At the 2006 census, its population was 27, in 7 families.

References 

Populated places in Bavanat County